Ezra Jack Keats (né Jacob Ezra Katz; March 11, 1916 – May 6, 1983) was an American writer and illustrator of children's books. He won the 1963 Caldecott Medal for illustrating The Snowy Day, which he also wrote. Keats wrote A Letter to Amy and Hi, Cat! but he was most famous for The Snowy Day. It is considered one of the most important American books of the 20th century.

Keats is best known for introducing multiculturalism into mainstream American children's literature. He was one of the first children's book authors to use an urban setting for his stories and he developed the use of collage as a medium for illustration.

Biography

Jack Keats was born Jacob Ezra Katz on March 11, 1916, in East New York, Brooklyn, the third child of Polish-Jewish immigrants Benjamin Katz and Augusta Podgainy. The family was very poor. Jack, as he was known, was artistic from an early age, and joyfully made pictures out of whatever scraps of wood, cloth and paper that he could collect. Benjamin Katz, who worked as a waiter, tried to discourage his son, insisting that artists lived terrible, impoverished lives. Nevertheless, he sometimes brought home tubes of paint, claiming, "A starving artist swapped this for a bowl of soup."

With little encouragement at home, Keats sought validation for his skills at school and learned about art at the public library. He received a medal for drawing on graduating from Junior High School 149. Although unimpressive-looking, the medal meant a great deal to him, and he kept it his entire life. Keats attended Thomas Jefferson High School, where he won a national contest run by Scholastic for an oil painting depicting hobos warming themselves around a fire. At his graduation, in January 1935, he was to receive the senior class medal for excellence in art. Two days before the ceremony, Benjamin Katz died in the street of a heart attack. When Keats identified his father's body, he later wrote, "I found myself staring deep into his secret feelings. There in his wallet were worn and tattered newspaper clippings of the notices of the awards I had won. My silent admirer and supplier, he had been torn between his dread of my leading a life of hardship and his real pride in my work."

His father's death curtailed his dream of attending art school. For the remainder of the Great Depression until he was drafted for military service in World War II, Keats took art classes when he could and worked at a number of jobs, most notably as a mural painter under the New Deal program the Works Progress Administration (WPA) and as a comic book illustrator. At Fawcett Publications, he illustrated backgrounds for the Captain Marvel comic strip. He spent his military service (1943–45) designing camouflage patterns for the U.S. Army Air Force. In 1947, he petitioned to legally change his name to Ezra Jack Keats, in reaction to the anti-Semitic prejudice of the time.

Keats spent most of 1949 painting and studying in Paris, realizing a long-deferred dream of working as an artist. After returning to New York, he focused on earning a living as a commercial artist, undoubtedly influenced by his father's anxieties. His illustrations began to appear in Reader's Digest, The New York Times Book Review, Collier's and Playboy, and on the jackets of popular books. His work was displayed in Fifth Avenue store windows, and the Associated American Artists Gallery, in New York City, gave him exhibitions in 1950 and 1954.

In his unpublished autobiography, Keats wrote, "I didn't even ask to get into children's books." In fact, he was asked to do so by Elizabeth Riley of Crowell, which brought out his first children's title, Jubilant for Sure, written by Elisabeth Hubbard Lansing, in 1954. To prepare for the assignment, Keats went to rural Kentucky, where the story takes place, to sketch. Many children's books followed, including the Danny Dunn adventure series, by Jay Williams and Raymond Abrashkin, and an ethnographic series by Tillie S. Pine and Joseph Levine, beginning with The Indians Knew. All told, Keats illustrated nearly 70 books written by other authors.

In 1983, Keats died at the age of 67 following a heart attack. His last projects included designing the sets for a musical version of his book The Trip (which would later become the stage production Captain Louie), designing a poster for The New Theater of Brooklyn, and writing and illustrating a retelling of the folktale "The Giant Turnip." He never married and often said that his characters were his children. 
 
After his death, the Ezra Jack Keats Foundation, which he had established in 1964, became active. Under the administration of his close friends Martin and Lillie Pope, the foundation was dedicated to preserving the quality of Keats' books and artworks, promoting children's literacy and creativity, and maintaining quality and diversity in children's literature. One of the Foundation's program is the Ezra Jack Keats Book Award. The Keats Archive, which includes original artwork and correspondence, is housed at the University of Southern Mississippi as part of the de Grummond Children's Literature Collection.

Books
Keats' works have been translated into some 20 languages, including Japanese, French, Danish, Norwegian, Spanish, Italian, Portuguese, Turkish, German, Swedish, Thai, Chinese, and Korean.

My Dog Is Lost was Keats' first attempt at writing his own children's book, co-authored with Pat Cherr, in 1960. The main character, Juanito, is an eight-year-old Spanish speaker newly arrived in New York City from Puerto Rico who has lost his dog. Searching throughout the city, he is helped by children in Chinatown, Little Italy, Park Avenue and Harlem. In this early work, Keats incorporated Spanish words into the story and featured minority children as central characters.

Two years later, Viking published The Snowy Day, which received the Caldecott Medal for the most distinguished picture book for children in 1963. The story follows a very young boy named Peter as he spends a day playing in the snow. Peter is African-American, although his race is never mentioned. Peter was inspired by a Life magazine clipping from 1940. Keats wrote, "Then began an experience that turned my life around — working on a book with a black kid as hero. None of the manuscripts I'd been illustrating featured any black kids — except for token blacks in the background. My book would have him there simply because he should have been there all along."

After years of illustrating books written by others, Keats found a voice of his own through Peter. The techniques that give The Snowy Day its unique look — collage with cutouts of patterned paper fabric and oilcloth; handmade stamps; spatterings of India ink with a toothbrush — were methods Keats had never used before. "I was like a child playing," he wrote. "I was in a world with no rules." The Snowy Day was one of 22 books written and illustrated by Keats, and more than any other, became a classic of children's literature.
 
Peter appears in a total of seven books, during which he grows and matures: Whistle for Willie, Peter's Chair, A Letter to Amy, Goggles!, Hi, Cat! and Pet Show!.  Keats skillfully weaves into his plots a sense of the dilemmas and even dangers his protagonists face. In The Snowy Day Peter, about four years old, yearns to join a snowball fight but learns he is too small when a stray snowball knocks him down. Later, he learns how to assume the role of older brother (Peter's Chair), to stand up to his friends when he invites a girl to his birthday party (A Letter to Amy), and to avoid the violence of a gang of older boys (Goggles!).

One of Keats&apos; signature story elements is that the children in his books are consistently challenged with real problems that are recognizable to young readers; in solving them, the characters learn and mature. In a later series of four books beginning with Louie, Keats introduces a silent, lonely and brooding child who responds to a puppet during a puppet show with a joyous Hello! Louie lives largely in his imagination, constructing a diorama in a shoebox and escaping into it in The Trip, and building a spaceship out of detritus and traveling among the planets in Regards to the Man in the Moon. But he is resilient enough to search for a candidate for a stepfather, and find one, in Louie's Search, and to learn to stand up to taunts from other children. Keats has said that Louie is the character he most related to, having felt invisible and unloved as a child and escaping through his creative pursuits.

Many of Keats' stories portray family life and the simple pleasures in a child's daily routine. Jennie's Hat illustrates the excitement of a child anticipating a present. Goggles! tells the story of boys finding a pair of goggles, and the chase that follows when a gang of bullies wants them, too. Keats drew on his own experiences growing up, often offering positive outcomes as an antidote to his unhappy childhood. Yet the particular events and environments in Keats' stories have an emotional resonance that children around the world have responded to. This was certainly his intention. Keats said, "I wanted The Snowy Day to be a chunk of life, the sensory experience in word and picture of what it feels like to hear your own body making sounds in the snow. Crunch...crunch...And the joy of being alive."

After The Snowy Day, Keats blended collage with gouache, an opaque watercolor mixed with a gum that produced an oil-like glaze. He marbled paper and worked with acrylics and watercolor, pen and ink and even photographs. The simplicity and directness of The Snowy Day gave way to more complex and painterly compositions, such as the expressionistic illustrations in Apt. 3.

In his evolution from fine artist to children's book illustrator, Ezra applied influences and techniques that had inspired him as a painter, from Cubism to abstraction, within a cohesive, and often highly dramatic, narrative structure. His artwork also demonstrates an enormous emotional range, swinging from exuberant whimsy to deep desolation and back again.

Honors and memorials

Among the many honors Keats received for his 20-year contribution to children's literature are:
 The Snowy Day was awarded the Caldecott Medal and named one of the 150 most influential books of the 20th century by the New York Public Library.
 Keats was the first artist invited to design greeting cards for UNICEF.
 A skating rink in Kiyose, Japan, was named after him, in honor of his book Skates!.
 Keats was a member of the White House Forum on Child Development and the Mass Media and appeared on the celebrated PBS show Mister Rogers' Neighborhood several times; Sesame Street featured his book Peter's Chair, read aloud by First Lady Barbara Bush.
 He was awarded The University of Southern Mississippi Silver Medallion in 1980 during the Fay B. Kaigler Children's Book Festival as outstanding children's book author-illustrator.
 The city of Portland, Oregon, honored him with a parade, as did his readers in Tokyo, Japan.
 The Imagination Playground was set up by the Prospect Park Alliance in Brooklyn, New York, based on the characters from Keats' books. The centerpiece is a much visited bronze statue of Peter with his dog Willie, where a story hour takes place weekly in the summer.
 P.S. 253 in Brooklyn was renamed the Ezra Jack Keats International School.
In 2014, the Skirball Cultural Center in Los Angeles created a major retrospective of Keats' life and career. Outlets such as The Daily News, L.A. Weekly, and Time Out covered the exhibit. The National Endowment for the Arts also covered the exhibit on their Art Works blog.
In 2017, the United States Postal Service created Forever stamps in honor of Keats's Snowy Day. Outlets such as the Los Angeles Times, The New York Times, and The Washington Post covered the stamps' release.

Bibliography

Books written and illustrated
 My Dog Is Lost (1960)
 The Snowy Day (1962) — Caldecott Medal winner
 Whistle for Willie (1964)
 John Henry, An American Legend (1965)
 Jennie's Hat (1966)
 Peter's Chair (1967)
 A Letter to Amy (1968)
 Goggles! (1969) — a Caldecott runner-up
 Hi, Cat! (1970)
 Apt. 3 (1971)
 Pet Show! (1972)
 Skates! (1973)
 Pssst! Doggie- (1973)
 Dreams (1974)
 Kitten for a Day (1974)
 Louie (1975)
 The Trip  (1978)
 Maggie and the Pirate (1979)
 Louie's Search (1980)
 Regards to the Man in the Moon (1981)
 Clementina's Cactus (1982)
 One Red Sun, A Counting Book (1998)

Books adapted or compiled
 In a Spring Garden (edited by Richard Lewis, 1965)
 The Naughty Boy: A Poem (by John Keats, 1965)
 God is in the Mountain (1966)
 The Little Drummer Boy (by Katherine Davis, Henry Ohorati and Harry Simeone, 1968)
 Night (compiled by Ezra Jack Keats, photographs by Beverly Hall, 1969)
 Over in the Meadow (by Olive A. Wadsworth, 1971)

Books illustrated
 Over 85 books were illustrated by Ezra Jack Keats, not including the titles which he helped to write and/or edit. Most of these illustrated works were completed before his debut as an author/illustrator.

See also

References

External links
 Ezra Jack Keats Foundation
 "The Snowy Day and the Art of Ezra Jack Keats", Claudia J. Nahson, Jewish Museum/Yale University Press, 2011. Exhibition catalogue with essays and a timeline
 Keats at The de Grummond Children's Literature Collection, University of Southern Mississippi. A virtual exhibit of the Keats Archive and other useful links
 Ezra Jack Keats, A Bibliography of His Work,  University of Southern Mississippi. The Ezra Jack Keats Collection.

 

American children's writers
American children's book illustrators
Jewish American artists
Jewish American writers
Artists from Brooklyn
Writers from Brooklyn
Writers who illustrated their own writing
Caldecott Medal winners
Multiculturalism in the United States
1916 births
1983 deaths
Place of death missing
Thomas Jefferson High School (Brooklyn) alumni
20th-century American Jews